The Kamloops Rockets were a Tier II Junior "A" ice hockey team from Kamloops, British Columbia, Canada. They were a part of the British Columbia Junior Hockey League.

Kamloops Jr. Rockets 1961 - 1964
Kamloops Kraft Kings 1964 - 1967
Kamloops Rockets 1967 - 1973
Kamloops Braves 1976 - 1977
Kamloops Chiefs 1977 - 1978
Kamloops Rockets 1978 - 1979
Revelstoke Bruins/Rockets 1979 - 1980

History
Founded in 1961, the Rockets won the first three straight league titles and two British Columbia titles winning the Mowat Cup.  They won the league again in 1966 and 1971.  In 1973, the team was relocated to White Rock as Kamloops was granted a team in the Western Canada Hockey League called the Kamloops Chiefs.  The town got another Tier II Junior "A" club in 1976, and the WCHL team folded that same year.  In 1980, the team merged with the Revelstoke Bruins and moved to Revelstoke, British Columbia.  In 1981, the Kamloops Jr. Oilers were founded and have continued on as the successful Kamloops Blazers ever since.

Season-by-season record
Note: GP = Games Played, W = Wins, L = Losses, T = Ties, OTL = Overtime Losses, GF = Goals for, GA = Goals against

See also
List of ice hockey teams in British Columbia

Defunct British Columbia Hockey League teams
1961 establishments in British Columbia
1980 disestablishments in British Columbia
Sport in Kamloops